NGC 3426 is a lenticular galaxy located in the constellation Leo. It was discovered on March 23, 1887 by the astronomer Lewis A. Swift.

References

External links 
 

Leo (constellation)
3426
Lenticular galaxies
032577